Demonte Colony is a 2015 Indian Tamil-language horror thriller film written and directed by R. Ajay Gnanamuthu. The film stars Arulnithi. Also starring Ramesh Thilak, Sananth and Abishek Joseph George, the film is a fictional story set at the Demonte Colony in Alwarpet, Chennai. Demonte Colony features cinematography by Aravinnd Singh, songs composed by guitarist Keba Jeremiah, and an original score by S. Chinna.

The film was released on 22 May 2015 to critical acclaim and became an blockbuster at the box office. In 2022, a sequel, titled Demonte Colony 2: Vengeance of the Unholy, was announced, with Gnanamuthu returning as the director, and Arulnithi returning in the lead role.

Plot 
Raghavan, Sajith, Vimal and Srinivasan "Srini" are four friends. Out of false bravado, they decide to visit a dilapidated mansion in De Monte Colony, which is rumoured to be haunted. They sneak into the house and get separated in the darkness and have a chilling experience, although all of them manage to come out seemingly unscathed.

The next day, the four men go to an astrologer. Three of them get their thumb prints and their future predictions done whereas Sajith is told the astrologer will predict his future later, as he does not have the corresponding paraphernalia. They return home, and everything seems to be normal and Sajith goes to bed. But while Srini is driving his bike, he gets a phone call from the astrologer, who wants to discuss an important matter, but Srini is unable to hear the details, and the call gets dropped. When Srini reaches the astrologer's residence, he finds him dead.

Some time later, the friends are curious to know the story behind De Monte Colony, so Raghavan narrates the story. Years ago, the area was a colony of the Portuguese business tycoon Lord John De Monte, who owned almost half of Chennai. He wishes to gift his wife, so he orders a special necklace as a gift for his wife's birthday. Soon after his wife becomes mentally ill. He informs the situation to his son via mail, and consequently learns about the death of his son. A depressed De Monte wants to return to Portugal and travels to Calcutta to sell his properties in India before leaving.

When De Monte returns after five months, he learns that some orderly working in the house has raped his wife, leaving her pregnant. He further requests a doctor to treat his wife within the confines of the house, but the doctor refuses, citing hospital laws. Taking this as a mark of disrespect, De Monte kills the doctor and all his servants over lingering doubts as to who had raped his wife. Angered by this, the locals set fire to the house and a disturbed De Monte shoots barrels filled with gunpowder; the ensuing explosion kills everyone within the house including De Monte. Seemingly, a curse is set on the diamond necklace such that whoever tries to steal it will be killed, and the stolen necklace will return to De Monte's house in any way.

Raghavan reveals that he had stolen the necklace so that it could be sold for money. Eerie things begin to happen in their room – the TV does not switch off and, instead of the DVD that they had inserted, plays their own conversations where the death scenes were played. The power goes off, Srini contacts the electricity board for power help. Srini then adds about what happened to the astrologer. They play the call record, in which the astrologer reveals that Sajith has already died the last night. They all turn towards Sajith who is still sleeping.

The windows and doors do not open; the friends' cries for help are never heard outside. They take an ouija and ask some dreadful questions, then realises that no-one will return alive. Srini asks to burn the ouija, then it starts burning, then they sees "Sajith" waking up, drinking water from the fridge, not seeing anything what is happening and goes back to sleep. They get scared upon seeing him. Then Srini tells them to go back and sit at the same place where they sat to use the ouija board. They realise that the arrow pointed at Raghavan and Srini and Vimal couldn't hear what Raghavan is saying. Then they realise that he is haunted by the spirit. Raghavan writes on the TV that De Monte is going to kill them all and he dies in the same way how Vimal died in the TV. Srini tells Vimal that they don't know anything about De Monte's house and they will return alive. He reveals that if the same thing which happened in TV is going happen now a thing has happened in the TV: after Vimal and Raghavan died he managed to escape from home by opening the main door but as it didn't open there is a way to escape. Then  Srini gets haunted by the spirit and Vimal couldn't hear what Srini was saying and then he kills Vimal. Srini feels bad and sorry for killing his friend. His room starts to freeze.

When Srini sees a portion of the room where god was there did not freeze, he goes there and remembers the DVD which it showed after crossing some point, Raghava was haunted by the spirit. Srini discovers a window can be opened in the portion of the room. "Sajith" tries to stop Srini from escaping the room, but he remembers what the astrologer said, Sajith died last night, he immediately steps back, he escapes and runs towards a nearby tea shop, only to find that no-one can hear him; he realises he has become a ghost after dying when he attempted to jump out of the flat. Later, he witness the necklace being carried by "Sajith", returning to the De Monte Colony House.

Cast

Soundtrack 
The music was composed by Keba Jeremiah and released via Orange Music.

Release 
Demonte Colony was released on 22 May 2015. It was distributed by Sri Thenandal Films.

Critical reception 
Malini Mannath of The New Indian Express wrote, "Brilliantly written and executed, gripping and refreshing, Demonte Colony is a must watch for lovers of the genre". Sify wrote, "Demonte Colony does sincere attempt to scare us and seriously it is one of the well written, superbly executed horror thrillers in recent times that keep us engaged throughout its crisp running time of 116 minutes". Anupama Subramanian of Deccan Chronicle wrote, "what really shines are the foundations and technical execution of the film: writing, narration, pacing (although first half drags a bit), lighting, cameras, and sound", calling the film "a scary and entertaining affair that promises to surprise and amuse you". M. Suganth of The Times of India gave the film 3 stars out of 5 and wrote, "R Ajay Gnanamuthu's Demonte Colony is a refreshing change – it is a pure horror film with no frills attached...and this alone makes us want to appreciate the director....But despite the visual flair, Demonte Colony at times gets bogged down by predictability and the lack of a genuine sense of dread".

S. Saraswathi of Rediff.com gave the same rating, stating, "Almost entirely shot in a single room with no gruesome ghosts or unnecessary build up, the director has skilfully created the eerie atmosphere, with incessant rain, a subtle aura of menace, unsophisticated characters and underlying hint of truth. The film is undoubtedly a fine attempt by the debutant director". Sudhir Srinivasan of The Hindu wrote, "you could make a case for Demonte Colony being a brave debut for R Ajay Gnanamuthu...He wants to shake you up and leave you walking out nervously, petrified of the dark and the dead. But he needed something more: new ideas to show the horrors unleashed by the evil spirit. The ones he uses aren’t enough".

Box office 
Demonte Colony opened at the number one position at the Chennai box office, with an opening weekend gross of ₹6401,000, described by International Business Times as an "appreciable feat for a movie that does not feature an A-list star".

Sequel 
In 2022, a sequel, titled Demonte Colony 2: Vengeance of the Unholy, was announced, with Ajay Gnanamuthu returning as the director. It was also announced that Arulnithi will return in the lead role, with Priya Bhavani Shankar and Arun Pandian joining the cast.

References

External links 
 

2010s supernatural horror films
2010s Tamil-language films
2015 directorial debut films
2015 films
2015 horror films
2015 horror thriller films
Films set in Chennai
Indian buddy films
Indian horror thriller films
Indian supernatural horror films